Boana cordobae is a species of frog in the family Hylidae that is endemic to Argentina.

Its natural habitats are temperate forests, rivers, intermittent rivers, swamps, freshwater marshes, and intermittent freshwater marshes. Its status is insufficiently known.

Sources

Boana
Amphibians of Argentina
Endemic fauna of Argentina
Amphibians described in 1965
Taxonomy articles created by Polbot